Young Bess is a 1953 Technicolor biographical film made by Metro-Goldwyn-Mayer about the early life of Elizabeth I, from her turbulent childhood to the eve of her accession to the throne of England. It stars Jean Simmons as Elizabeth and Stewart Granger as Thomas Seymour, with Charles Laughton as Elizabeth's father, Henry VIII, a part he had played 20 years before in The Private Life of Henry VIII.

Plot
Following the execution of her mother, Anne Boleyn (Elaine Stewart), for infidelity, King Henry VIII (Charles Laughton) exiles the child Elizabeth (Noreen Corcoran) to Hatfield House, after declaring her illegitimate and removing her from eligible succession to the throne. Over the years, her position rises and falls according to the whims of her father. The child is periodically summoned to return to London to become acquainted with each of Henry's latest spouses. When Henry marries his last wife, Catherine Parr (Deborah Kerr), the now-teenage Elizabeth (Jean Simmons) rebels against her latest summons but is persuaded by the handsome, tactful Lord Admiral Thomas Seymour (Stewart Granger) to change her mind. She meets Catherine, and the two become good friends. Meanwhile, Henry is impressed and amused by the resolute defiance of his daughter, and he declares her once again a legitimate heiress to the crown.

When Henry dies, Thomas's scheming brother Ned (Guy Rolfe) takes over as Lord Protector and guardian of King Edward VI (Rex Thompson), overriding Henry's dying wish that Thomas raise the boy. Ned's fear of his brother's ambition grows with each of Thomas's naval triumphs. In the meantime, Elizabeth realizes she is in love with Thomas, but graciously persuades her brother, King Edward, to issue a royal decree sanctioning the marriage of Thomas and Catherine. Despite the union, Thomas grows close to Elizabeth without realizing it until he witnesses Elizabeth being kissed by Barnaby, a courtier. Prompted by jealousy, Thomas kisses Elizabeth, who declares her love for him. Catherine, who has noticed the closeness between her husband and Elizabeth, asks Elizabeth to make a choice, and the princess moves back to Hatfield.

Soon after, Catherine sickens and dies. After months of Thomas being away at sea, he returns and finally sees Elizabeth. Ned has him arrested and charged with treason. He also accuses Elizabeth of plotting with Thomas to overthrow her brother, the king. She goes to see Edward, but is too late to save Thomas from execution. The film then shifts forward to 1558. Having survived the perils of her early life, and with Edward deceased and her elder sister Mary dying, Elizabeth is about to become Queen of England.

Cast

Production

Original novel
The novel was published in 1944 in Britain and in 1945 in the US. It became a best seller.

Development
MGM bought the rights to the novel in February 1945. Katherine Anne Porter and Jan Lustig signed to write the script and Sidney Franklin was producer. Eventually a script by Lustig and Arthur Wimperis was finished in 1946 and Franklin said "we were full of enthusiasm for it." In May 1947 Deborah Kerr was tested for the lead role.

In March 1948 MGM announced they would make the film in Britain. It was to be the second in a series of films made there, following Edward, My Son.  In May 1948 MGM said that Deborah Kerr and Errol Flynn were "definite" for the film. However filming did not proceed.

In August 1948 Walter Pidgeon and Janet Leigh were reportedly tested for lead roles. Elizabeth Taylor was considered for the title role as was Deborah Kerr (if it was going to be the latter the character would be aged up). In November 1948 MGM put the film on its schedule for the following year. However, filming kept being postponed. In April 1949 MGM announced they were negotiating a contract with James Mason, whom they wanted to put in Young Bess and Robinson Crusoe.

In December 1950 Jean Simmons emerged as a favorite to play the title role. This was partly at the behest of J. Arthur Rank who had Simmons under contract and thought the role would be perfect for her. In February 1951 MGM announced Simmons would co star with her husband, Stewart Granger. Filming continued to be pushed back in part because Simmons became enmeshed in a contractual dispute with Howard Hughes. In October 1951 Charles Laughton signed to play Henry VIII. In August 1952 Deborah Kerr wound up joining the cast as Catherine Parr.

Filming
Filming took place in Hollywood starting in October 1952. Producer Sidney Franklin said:

We're telling an intimate story against a background of sixteenth century court life, as opposed to a historical pageant about royal intrigues. We feel the love story between the Princess and Seymour – actually he was 25 years older than Elizabeth – will be more valid to audiences than a lot of historical detail which has no relation to our customers lives.

The musical score was composed by Miklós Rózsa, who was becoming known for his research on historical subjects. It incorporates tunes from the Fitzwilliam Virginal Book and other Tudor sources.

Reception
Contemporary reviews were positive. A. H. Weiler of The New York Times wrote in a favorable review that "if faint strains of soap opera occasionally filter through the pomp and circumstance, Elizabeth of England and some of the storied figures who crowd this beautiful Technicolored tapestry, emerge as human beings." Variety called it "a remarkably engrossing motion picture" and "a human story, sensitively written, directed and played." "A strong romantic costume drama", declared Harrison's Reports. "The direction is faultless, the production values lavish, and the color photography exquisite." John McCarten of The New Yorker wrote that the plot "may sound like a Madison Avenue concept of history, but as directed by George Sidney, the piece doesn't churn up too much sudsy bathos to be intolerable, and, indeed, the cast goes about its work with such sincerity that you can enjoy the thing as a handsome costume exercise even though you're skeptical about Miss Irwin's history."

The film was Stewart Granger's favourite of all those he made for MGM "for the costumes, the cast, the story."

Box office
According to MGM records, the film earned $1,645,000 in North America and $2,450,000 elsewhere, leading to a loss of $272,000.

In France, the film recorded admissions of 1,465,207.

Awards
The film was nominated for two Academy Awards; for Best Costume Design and Best Art Direction (Cedric Gibbons, Urie McCleary, Edwin B. Willis, Jack D. Moore).

See also
 Anne Boleyn in popular culture

References

Further reading

External links

 
 
 
 
ZReview of film at Variety

1953 films
1950s biographical drama films
1953 romantic drama films
American biographical drama films
American romantic drama films
1950s English-language films
Cultural depictions of Edward VI of England
Cultural depictions of Anne Boleyn
Films directed by George Sidney
Films set in Tudor England
Films about Elizabeth I
Films about Henry VIII
Films scored by Miklós Rózsa
Metro-Goldwyn-Mayer films
1950s American films